The Canary Effect is a 2006 documentary film that looks into the effects that the United States and its policies have on the Indigenous peoples (Native Americans) who are residents. It premiered at the Tribeca Film Festival and won the Stanley Kubrick Award at the 2006 Traverse City Film Festival.

The movie was directed by Robin Davey and Yellow Thunder Woman, who are both members of LA Based alternative pop group The Bastard Fairies. The documentary was released on DVD in 2008.

References

External links
Official site

U.S. Capitalism Arose Upon Conquest of Indians by George Novack, The Militant, April 6, 2009

2006 films
American documentary films
Documentary films about indigenous rights
2006 documentary films
Documentary films about Native Americans
2000s English-language films
2000s American films